The Bell-Johnson House, at 12 North 200 East in Richmond, Utah, was built around 1875.  It was listed on the National Register of Historic Places in 2004.  The listing included three contributing buildings.

It is Late Victorian in style.

References

		
National Register of Historic Places in Cache County, Utah
Victorian architecture in Utah

Houses completed in 1875